Fredericia Stadium (Danish: Fredericia Stadion ; currently known as Monjasa Park  for sponsorship reasons) is a football stadium in Fredericia, Denmark. It opened on 2 September 2006, as the new home ground for Danish 1st Division club FC Fredericia.

It has a capacity of 4,000, of which 1,400 are seated.

In May 2020, Fredericia Municipality announced at a press conference plans for upgrading Monjasa Park. A new stand with a seating capacity of 1,400 and terracing able to hold 500 away-fans were planned for construction before the end of the year. The plans would see stadium infrastructure improve and prepare FC Fredericia for a possible future promotion to the Danish Superliga, which mayor Jacob Bjerregaard stated could happen within the "next 2–3 years".

References 

Football venues in Denmark
Buildings and structures in Fredericia Municipality
Sports venues in the Region of Southern Denmark
FC Fredericia